This is a list of Members of Parliament (MPs) elected in the 1837 general election.

List

References

See also 

 List of parliaments of the United Kingdom

1837 United Kingdom general election
1837
UK MPs 1837–1841
1837-related lists